Police museums display police memorabilia related to a local police department or the history of law enforcement or emergency services in an area.

Canada
Ontario Provincial Police Museum, Canada
 RCMP Heritage Centre, Regina, Saskatchewan
 Rotary Museum of Police and Corrections, Prince Albert, Saskatchewan
 Vancouver Police Museum
 Winnipeg Police Museum

United Kingdom
 Bow Street Police Museum
 Glasgow Police Museum, Scotland (entry free)
 Hampshire Police and Fire Heritage Trust, housed in the Solent Sky Museum
 Kent Police Museum, Chatham, Kent, England
 Metropolitan Police Museum, London
 National Emergency Services Museum in Sheffield, England
 Thames Valley Police Museum
 West Midlands Police Museum, Birmingham, England
 The Museum of Policing in Devon & Cornwall, Devon, England

United States
 Alaska State Troopers Museum
 The Greater Cincinnati Police Historical Society Museum
 Cleveland Police Historical Society Museum
 Maryland State Police Museum, Pikesville
 National Law Enforcement Museum, Washington, DC
 New York City Police Museum
 San Diego County Sheriff's Museum
 Seattle Metropolitan Police Museum
 Texas Ranger Hall of Fame and Museum
 Phoenix Police Museum

Elsewhere
 Cyprus Police Museum
 Hong Kong Police Museum
 Garda Museum, Dublin, Ireland
 National Police Museum India
 Police Heritage Centre (Singapore Police Force)
 Police Museum (Stockholm), Sweden
 Venlo Police Museum, Netherlands
 World Police Museum, Taiwan
 Sindh Police Museum, Pakistan
 Punjab Police Museum, Pakistan

See also 

 Crime museum (disambiguation)
 Fire museum

Law enforcement museums
Police